This is a list of episodes of the South Korean variety-music show King of Mask Singer in 2017. The show airs on MBC as part of their Sunday Night lineup. The names listed below are in performance order.

 – Contestant is instantly eliminated by the live audience and judging panel
 – After being eliminated, contestant performs a prepared song for the next round and takes off their mask during the instrumental break
 – After being eliminated and revealing their identity, contestant has another special performance
 – Contestant advances to the next round
 – Contestant becomes the challenger
 – Mask King

Episodes

46th Generation Mask King (cont.)
Contestants : Heo Kyung-hwan, Yoo Yeon-jung (I.O.I/Cosmic Girls), Jung Seung-hwan, Kim Hyun-jung,  (Eve),  (Ulala Session), Ji So-yun

Episode 92 was broadcast on January 1, 2017.

47th Generation Mask King

Episode 93

Episode 93 was broadcast on January 8, 2017. This marks the beginning of the Forty-seventh Generation.

Episode 94

Episode 94 was broadcast on January 15, 2017.

48th Generation Mask King
Contestants : U Sung-eun, Kim Se-jeong (I.O.I/Gugudan), Jo Jung-chi, Choi Min-soo,  (Norazo), DinDin, Jiyai Shin, Seohyun (Girls' Generation)

Episode 95

Episode 95 was broadcast on January 22, 2017. This marks the beginning of the Forty-eighth Generation.

Episode 96

Episode 96 was broadcast on January 29, 2017.

49th Generation Mask King
Contestants : Lee Yi-kyung, Son Jun-ho, Mithra Jin (Epik High), Hyojung (Oh My Girl), Heo Cham, DK (December)

Episode 97

Episode 97 was broadcast on February 5, 2017. This marks the beginning of the Forty-ninth Generation.

Episode 98

Episode 98 was broadcast on February 12, 2017.

50th Generation Mask King
Contestants : Shindong (Super Junior), Bonggu, Park Sang-min, Kim Seung-hyun, Lee Su-hyun (AKMU), Lee Chan-hyuk (AKMU), Im Ye-jin, 

Episode 99

Episode 99 was broadcast on February 19, 2017. This marks the beginning of the Fiftieth Generation.

Episode 100

Episode 100 was broadcast on February 26, 2017.

51st Generation Mask King
Contestants : Lee Jong-hyun (CNBLUE), N (VIXX), Lina (The Grace), Kim Jae-kyung (Rainbow), Park Sung-kwang, Lee Hae-ri (Davichi), 

Episode 101

Episode 101 was broadcast on March 5, 2017. This marks the beginning of the Fifty-first Generation.

Episode 102

Episode 102 was broadcast on March 12, 2017. The second half of this episode wasn't aired since 17:45 (KST) due to live broadcast about the former president Park Geun-hye's departure from the Blue House after her impeachment on March 10, 2017. The rest of this episode was broadcast on March 19, 2017 at 16:50 (KST), before the new episode 103.

52nd Generation Mask King
Contestants : Hwangbo (Chakra), On Joo-wan, Lisa, J-Min, Roseanne Park (Blackpink), Go Ah-sung, 

Episode 103

Episode 103 was broadcast on March 19, 2017 at 18:10 (KST), into the time frame of Secretly Greatly. This marks the beginning of the Fifty-second Generation.

Episode 104

Episode 104 was broadcast on March 26, 2017.

53rd Generation Mask King
Contestants : Moon Se-yoon, Lee Hong-gi (F.T. Island), Shim Eun-jin (Baby Vox), Bae In-hyuk (Romantic Punch), Seo Kyung-seok, Sohyang, Minzy (2NE1)

Episode 105

Episode 105 was broadcast on April 2, 2017. This marks the beginning of the Fifty-third Generation.

Episode 106

Episode 106 was broadcast on April 9, 2017.

54th Generation Mask King
Contestants : , Kei (Lovelyz), Zhang Yu'an, Min Do-hee, 

Episode 107

Episode 107 was broadcast on April 16, 2017. This marks the beginning of the Fifty-fourth Generation.

Episode 108

Episode 108 was broadcast on April 23, 2017.

55th Generation Mask King
Contestants : Junggigo, Kang Seung-yoon (Winner), Shin Bo-ra, Ahn Shin-ae (The Barberettes),  (Yurisangja), Lee Se-young, Park Ji-min (15&)

Episode 109

Episode 109 was broadcast on April 30, 2017. This marks the beginning of the Fifty-fifth Generation.

Episode 110

Episode 110 was broadcast on May 7, 2017.

56th Generation Mask King

Episode 111

Episode 111 was broadcast on May 14, 2017. This marks the beginning of the Fifty-sixth Generation.

Episode 112

Episode 112 was broadcast on May 21, 2017.

57th Generation Mask King

Episode 113

Episode 113 was broadcast on May 28, 2017. This marks the beginning of the Fifty-seventh Generation.

Episode 114

Episode 114 was broadcast on June 4, 2017.

58th Generation Mask King
Contestants : Shannon, Kim Ji-sook (Rainbow), Henry (Super Junior-M), Sanchez (Phantom), Jung Chan-woo (Cultwo), Ryu Tae-joon, John Park

Episode 115

Episode 115 was broadcast on June 11, 2017. This marks the beginning of the Fifty-eighth Generation.

Episode 116

Episode 116 was broadcast on June 18, 2017.

59th Generation Mask King
Contestants : Jang Jane, Soohyun (U-KISS), Kim Hwa-soo (T.△.S (티삼스)), Bobby (iKON), Seo Min-jung, Johan Kim

Episode 117

Episode 117 was broadcast on June 25, 2017. This marks the beginning of the Fifty-ninth Generation.

Episode 118

Episode 118 was broadcast on July 2, 2017.

60th Generation Mask King
Contestants : Oh Ha-young (Apink), Ryan (Paran), Im Se-mi, Lee Hi, Junho (2PM), K.Will, Janghyun (Vromance)

Episode 119

Episode 119 was broadcast on July 9, 2017. This marks the beginning of the Sixtieth Generation.

Episode 120

Episode 120 was broadcast on July 16, 2017.

61st Generation Mask King

Episode 121

Episode 121 was broadcast on July 23, 2017. This marks the beginning of the Sixty-first Generation.

Episode 122

Episode 122 was broadcast on July 30, 2017.

62nd Generation Mask King

Episode 123

Episode 123 was broadcast on August 6, 2017. This marks the beginning of the Sixty-second Generation.

Episode 124

Episode 124 was broadcast on August 13, 2017.

63rd Generation Mask King

Episode 125

Episode 125 was broadcast on August 20, 2017. This marks the beginning of the Sixty-third Generation.

Episode 126

Episode 126 was broadcast on August 27, 2017.

64th Generation Mask King
Contestants : Kim Na-young, G.Soul,  (8Eight), Kim Chung-ha, Go Young-bae (Soran), Lee Elijah, Lee Bo-ram (SeeYa)

Episode 127

Episode 127 was broadcast on September 3, 2017. This marks the beginning of the Sixty-fourth Generation.

Episode 128

On September 4, 2017, a major strike broke out with unions representing employees of the Korean Broadcasting System and Munhwa Broadcasting Company, complaining over unfair labour practices and government interference in news coverage by favouring Park Geun-hye, who at the time had been impeached for corruption.  Both stations are effectively controlled by the government, with Korean Broadcasting the state broadcaster, and Munhwa 70% owned by the government.  Both stations' heads are appointed by the government.  The strike ended on November 15, 2017, after Munhwa president Kim Jang-kyom was fired, which was a demand of the union in this labour stoppage.

Upon the conclusion of the labour stoppage, Episode 128, which had been postponed nine weeks, was broadcast on November 19, 2017.

65th Generation Mask King
Contestants : Sunwoo Jung-a, Park Hee-jin, Umji (GFriend), Im Ha-ryong, Lee Ji-young (Big Mama), Youngjae (B.A.P)

Episode 129

Episode 129 was broadcast on November 26, 2017. This marks the beginning of the Sixty-fifth Generation.

Episode 130

Episode 130 was broadcast on December 3, 2017.

66th Generation Mask King
Contestants : Jeon Ji-yoon, Kim Won-joo (4Men), Park Kwang-seon (Ulala Session), Choi Il-hwa, Jeong Se-woon, Ben, Choi Yoo-jung (Weki Meki)

Episode 131

Episode 131 was broadcast on December 10, 2017. This marks the beginning of the Sixty-sixth Generation.

Episode 132

Episode 132 was broadcast on December 17, 2017.

67th Generation Mask King
Contestants : Han Bo-reum, Kwak Dong-hyun (곽동현), Kwon Hyuk-soo, Kim Byung-se, LE (EXID), Son Seung-won, Shin Yeon-ah (Big Mama), Park Jung-min (SS501)

Episode 133

Episode 133 was broadcast on December 24, 2017. This marks the beginning of the Sixty-seventh Generation.

Episode 134

Episode 134 was broadcast on December 31, 2017.

Notes

References 

Lists of King of Mask Singer episodes
Lists of variety television series episodes
Lists of South Korean television series episodes
2017 in South Korean television